Findlay Market in historic Over-the-Rhine, Cincinnati, Ohio, is the state's oldest continuously operated public market. The Findlay Market Building was listed on the National Register of Historic Places (NRHP) on June 5, 1972. The market is the last remaining of the nine that once served Cincinnati. In 2019 Newsweek named it one of the top ten public markets in the world.

History
Findlay Market was founded in 1852, on land donated by the estate of General James Findlay and his wife Jane Irwin Findlay. Built with the new iron framework technology, this was one of the earliest structures in the nation in which that technique was used, and one of the few remaining. The market bell from Pearl Street Market, Cincinnati's first market house, now hangs in Findlay Market's bell tower.

The market is located north of downtown Cincinnati in Over-the-Rhine, an historic neighborhood known for its dense concentration of Italianate architecture. Open year-round, Tuesday through Sunday, Findlay Market has more than about three dozen indoor merchants selling meat, fish, poultry, produce, flowers, cheese, deli, and ethnic foods.

On Saturdays and Sundays from March to December, the Market hosts a farmers' market and other outdoor vendors, street performers, and special events. The Findlay Market Opening Day Parade for the Cincinnati Reds is an annual Cincinnati tradition. Findlay Market is a gathering place for people from all over the city. It routinely attracts crowds that are socially, economically, racially, and ethnically diverse.

In 2019 Newsweek named Findlay Market one of the top ten public markets in the world.

Market District Development
The Findlay Market district is a center of economic activity in Over-the-Rhine. Cincinnati City Council named The Corporation for Findlay Market its Preferred Developer for 39 city-owned properties near the market in June 2006.

In 2010, the market became 100% occupied and continues to grow. In 2004, the City of Cincinnati completed a $16 million renovation of the market.

In popular culture
Johnny Cash visits Findlay Market in a scene of the movie The Pride of Jesse Hallam. Findlay Market is mentioned in "Oh, Cincinnati," a song by the local band The Seedy Seeds.

Gallery

Notes

External links

 Findlay Market official website  – market history and vendor information

Buildings and structures in Cincinnati
Economy of Cincinnati
National Register of Historic Places in Cincinnati
1852 establishments in Ohio
Food markets in the United States
Commercial buildings completed in 1852
Cuisine of Cincinnati
Over-the-Rhine
Market halls
Tourist attractions in Cincinnati